Gabriela Revilla (born May 23, 1982) is a Nicaraguan-born American film director and producer and writer. She began her career as a talent booker within the areas of music, celebrity, sports and theater for television, live events, interactive, and film, eventually leading to casting and producing for multi-platform web initiatives and motion pictures. She is a celebrity booker in the music and celebrity talent world, with an incredibly diverse portfolio. In addition to producing, casting, and talent booking, she is also a writer with several projects currently in development.

Biography 
Gabby Revilla is an independent producer and the principal of Revek Entertainment. By the end of 2013, Revilla will have produced 8 titles including, Jason Blum’s Stage Fright, Caliber Media and Revek Entertainment’s Some Kind of Hate, Peter and Antonia Bogdanovich's, "Phantom Halo", and Paramount Insurge's Destination Wedding. Her company also owns GNR Casting & Talent  which has cast and booked TV and multi-media projects for AOL, Café Mom, GSN, Bravo, Rogue State, The Conlin Company, World of Wonder, etc. She has produced several films including Matthew Lillard's directorial debut, Fat Kid Rules The World, winner of the Audience Award at the SXSW Film Festival.  She has also produced short film projects for Universal, Right of Way Films, and Blumhouse. Most recently, Gabby produced Jason Reitman and Jason Blum's Whiplash, which won the Sundance Jury Selection Short Film Award.

Gabby began her career at Live Nation where she booked artists such as Gavin DeGraw, George Carlin, Jaguars, and the Backstreet Boys at clubs and theaters.  She went on to work for Martin Short and his critically acclaimed Broadway show, Fame Becomes Me, booking celebrity talent, including Conan O'Brien, Jon Stewart, Jerry Seinfeld, Victor Garber, and Matthew Broderick, for 8 shows a week during its entire duration.  Gabby then moved to MTV Networks where she played key roles in booking talent for Sucker Free, The Big Ten, TRL, Mi TRL, Fashionista, Nick Cannon's Wild 'n Out, MTV Cribs, the MTV Movie Awards, MTV Video Music Awards, and more.  She was also a key player in securing additional revenue for MTV's bilingual channel MTV Tr3s in film studio marketing dollars.  During this time, CNN, featured her in their article, "Faces of the Future."  In 2009, Gabby joined The Wendy Williams Show as Talent Executive for two seasons until she left to pursue film and TV endeavors in Los Angeles. She currently has several projects in development. Revilla is represented by APA.

In 2014 Revilla become one of 20th Century Fox's FWI writers intensive fellows. Gabby's Revek Entertainment, continues to work with Top networks and industry talent on film, new media content and celebrity talent booking as a production company with a diverse portfolio.

Filmography

Producer 
 The Automatic Hate (2015) // feature film 
 Phantom Halo (2013 )  // feature film
 Breakdown (2013) // short film
 Family Trade (2013) // TV series, associate producer
 Whiplash (2013) // short film, line producer
 Paraphobia (2013) // feature film 
 MTV Video Music Awards (2008) // TV special
 MTV Video Music Awards (2007) // TV special

Talent Executive/Booker 
 The Eric Andre Show (2013) // TV series 
 The Wendy Williams Show (2009-2010) // TV series
 MTV Los Premios (2009) // TV movie
 Made (2007-2009) // TV series
 Karlifornia (2008) // TV series
 mtvU Woodie Awards (2008) // TV special
 Total Request Live (2007-2008) // TV series
 Los Premios MTV (2008) // TV movie
 MTV Video Music Awards (2008) // TV special
 Mi TRL (2006-2008) // TV series
 MTV Tr3s Fashionista (2008) // TV movie
 A Night for Vets: An MTV Concert for the Brave (2008) // TV special
 mtvU Woodie Awards (2007) // TV special
 MTV Los Premios (2007) // TV special
 Nick Cannon Presents: Wild 'N Out (2007) TV series
 mtvU Woodie Awards (2006) // TV special

Casting Director 
 Family Trade (2013) //TV series
 Karlifornia (2008) // TV series
 MTV Tr3s Fashionista (2008) // TV movie
 Mi TRL (2006) // TV series – Episode #1.1

Casting Department 
 Destination Wedding (2013)  // feature film
 Fat Kid Rules the World (2012) // feature film  
 MTV Tr3s Fashionista (2008) // TV movie

Writer 
 Breakdown (2013) // short film

Production Manager 
 Fat Kid Rules the World (2012) // feature film  
 MTV Movie Awards (2008) // TV special

External links 
 
 Revek Entertainment
 Voyage LA
 Deadline
 Hollywood Reporter 
 The Wrap

References 

Living people
American film producers
1982 births
Place of birth missing (living people)